Noctua is an Austrian computer hardware manufacturer of CPU-coolers and computer fans primarily for the enthusiast market. The company was founded in 2005 as a joint venture between the Austrian company Rascom Computerdistribution Ges.M.B.H., established in August 2000, and the Taiwanese cooling specialist Kolink International Corporation.

Noctua is a manufacturer within the enthusiast market.

The name "Noctua" refers to the scientific name of the little owl, Athene noctua (hence the owl found in the company's logo), which in Greek mythology stands for intelligence and wisdom. It's also known for its soundless flight and the effective, economical use of its powers and precise attack.

Products

Noctua's products include CPU-coolers. computer fans, thermal compounds, industrial applications, and partner products such as graphics cards.

Noctua's computer fan products are known for their brown and beige color-scheme, which has divided opinions among customers and enthusiasts. The color-scheme has been criticized, described by PC Gamer as "an ugly... khaki-and-mud color-scheme straight out of the '70s".

In recent years, Noctua has produced more conventional colour schemes under their chromax line that includes black editions of some CPU-coolers and fans, as well as various coloured heatsink covers, cables, and anti-vibration accessories. Noctua announced all-black versions of their most popular CPU coolers in the chromax.black series for the first time at Computex Taipei in 2018, and formally introduced them in October 2019.

Noctua's redux line features reissues of their most popular fans and coolers at a reduced price, in a light/dark grey color scheme. Fans in the redux line lack much of the technology found in the standard line, feature Noctua's first-generation SSO bearing, and come with no accessories.

Noctua’s industrialPPC (Protected Performance Cooling) line comprises ruggedized high-speed versions of the company's retail models, designed for industrial applications.

Partner collaborations
In October 2021, a Noctua-branded Nvidia GeForce RTX 3070 GPU (graphics processing unit) with Noctua cooling was released in collaboration with Asus. The cooling they produced for the RTX 3070 consists of a large heatsink and two full-sized Noctua NF-A12x25 PC fans for an effective 5-slot thickness (actual thickness 4.3 slots). In March 2022, Noctua confirmed further graphics card collaboration with Asus.

See also
 Computer cooling
 Quiet PC
 Be quiet!
 Cooler Master

References

External links
 

Computer hardware companies
Computer hardware cooling
2005 establishments in Austria
Technology companies of Austria